George Harry Cross (September 15, 1854 – November 28, 1946) was an American politician who served as a member of the Wyoming Senate as a Democrat.

Life
George Harry Cross was born in Montreal, Province of Canada to Julia Fisher Cross and Alex Cross, who was a member of the King's Council and was Chief Justice for the Province of Quebec, on September 15, 1854, and attended the High School of Montreal. He later attended the Upper Canada College, Nicolet College, and the University of Oxford. In December 1874 he moved to Riverbend, Colorado Territory and then moved to the Wyoming Territory in 1875. In 1883 he became an American citizen and in 1884 he returned to Montreal and married Lea Marie LeVasseur whom he would later have eleven children with, including Senate President George A. Cross.

In 1888 Cross was elected to the Converse county board of commissioners. He was elected to the Wyoming House of Representatives to represent Converse county and served from 1895 until 1897 then served again from 1909 to 1913. In 1896 he was selected as one of the Democratic presidential electors for Wyoming, but resigned to run for another term in the state senate.

In 1930 he was elected as president of the Wyoming Pioneer Association for a one year term. In 1934 Nate Warren, the Republican nominee for Colorado's gubernatorial election, was a guest to Cross's ranch for three days. On November 28, 1946, he died from pneumonia at his home in Douglas, Wyoming.

References

External links

1854 births
1946 deaths
19th-century American politicians
20th-century American politicians
Alumni of University College, Oxford
American people of Scottish descent
Canadian emigrants to the United States
Canadian people of Scottish descent
High School of Montreal alumni
People from Douglas, Wyoming
People with acquired American citizenship
Upper Canada College alumni
Democratic Party Wyoming state senators
Canadian expatriates in the United Kingdom